José Daniel Carreño Izquierdo (born 1 May 1963) is a Uruguayan football manager and former player. 

Commonly known as "El Crespo" (Spanish word: "The curly"), Carreño played as a striker and spent the majority of his playing career at Montevideo Wanderers, having also spells in RC Lens and Nacional, in where with the last mentioned, he won the Intercontinental Cup and the Copa Libertadores, his unic two titles in his career. Carreño had his most successful spell as a manager with Al-Nassr winning the League and crown prince cup double in 2014.

Coaching career

Al-Nassr
In September 2012, it was announced that Jose Daniel Carreno would take over as manager of Saudi Professional League club Al-Nassr after replacing Francisco Maturana.

Statistics

Honours

Player

Club
Nacional
 Copa Libertadores (1): 1988
 Intercontinental Cup (1): 1988

Manager

Club
Montevideo Wanderers
 Uruguayan Segunda División (1): 2000
 Copa Libertadores Uruguayan liguilla (1): 2001

Nacional
 Uruguayan Primera División (1): 2002
 Copa Libertadores Uruguayan liguilla (1): 2007

Al-Nassr
 Saudi Professional League (1): 2013–14
 Saudi Crown Prince Cup (1): 2013–14

External links
 Soccerway Profile
 Tenfield Digital Profile

1963 births
Living people
Association football forwards
Uruguayan footballers
Uruguayan expatriate footballers
Uruguayan football managers
Uruguayan Primera División players
Club Nacional de Football players
Unión de Santa Fe footballers
RC Lens players
Montevideo Wanderers F.C. players
Expatriate footballers in France
Expatriate footballers in Argentina
Uruguayan expatriate sportspeople in France
Uruguayan expatriate sportspeople in Costa Rica
Deportivo Cali managers
L.D.U. Quito managers
Club Deportivo Palestino managers
Montevideo Wanderers managers
Club Nacional de Football managers
Al Nassr FC managers
Al Shabab FC (Riyadh) managers
Al-Wehda Club (Mecca) managers
Saudi Professional League managers
Footballers from Montevideo
Expatriate football managers in Chile
Expatriate football managers in Colombia
Expatriate football managers in Ecuador
Expatriate football managers in Qatar
Expatriate football managers in Saudi Arabia
Uruguayan expatriate sportspeople in Chile
Uruguayan expatriate sportspeople in Colombia
Uruguayan expatriate sportspeople in Ecuador
Uruguayan expatriate sportspeople in Qatar
Uruguayan expatriate sportspeople in Saudi Arabia